FK Milicionar is a defunct football club based in Makiš, Belgrade, Serbia.

History
Founded in 1946, the club was operated by the Ministry of Internal Affairs. They won the Second League of FR Yugoslavia (Group East) in 1998, thus earning promotion to the First League. The club spent the next three seasons in the top flight, before finishing bottom of the table in 2000–01. They subsequently merged with Radnički Obrenovac, which continued to compete in the 2001–02 Second League of FR Yugoslavia. Simultaneously, the Ministry of Internal Affairs formed a new club, FK Policajac.

Honours
Second League of FR Yugoslavia (Tier 2)
 1997–98 (Group East)

Seasons

Notable players
This is a list of players who have played at full international level.
  Siniša Mulina
  Milivoje Ćirković
  Ivan Gvozdenović
  Oliver Kovačević
  Nenad Lalatović
  Nikola Lazetić
For a list of all FK Milicionar players with a Wikipedia article, see :Category:FK Milicionar players.

Managerial history

References

External links
 Club page at Srbijasport

1946 establishments in Serbia
2001 disestablishments in Serbia
Association football clubs disestablished in 2001
Association football clubs established in 1946
Defunct football clubs in Serbia
Football clubs in Belgrade
Police association football clubs
Čukarica